Nolan Wirth (born January 24, 1995) is a Canadian former professional soccer player.

Early career
Wirth began playing soccer in 2006 with Comox Valley United before joining Upper Vancouver Island United in 2009. In 2011, he joined the residency program of professional club Vancouver Whitecaps FC.

College career
From 2014 to 2016, he attended Oregon State University, where he played for the men's soccer team.

Club career
During the NCAA offseason, he played for Calgary Foothills FC in the Premier Development League in 2015. In 2016, he played with the Victoria Highlanders in the PDL.

In 2017, he attended preseason training camp with Whitecaps FC 2, but ultimately did not sign with the team. On June 9, 2017, Wirth signed his first professional contract with American USL side Phoenix Rising. he made two appearances on the bench for Phoenix that season, but failed to make his debut.

In 2018, Wirth returned to Canada and signed with Premier Development League side Victoria Highlanders.

On February 26, 2019, Wirth signed with Canadian Premier League side Pacific FC becoming the first native Vancouver Islander to sign with the team. On May 16, 2019, he made his debut for Pacific in the Canadian Championship against Cavalry FC. On July 1, 2019, Wirth made his league debut in a 3–1 win over Cavalry FC. On January 17, 2020, Wirth re-signed with Pacific for the 2020 season. He once again re-signed for the 2021 season. In early September 2021, he was granted a leave of absence from the club. On September 24, 2021, Wirth retired from professional soccer, so he could complete his degree from Oregon State and pursue a career outside of soccer.

International career
In 2013, Wirth represented Canada for the first time at the 2013 Torneo COTIF. He was a regular fixture at Canada U20 camps in the lead-up to the 2015 CONCACAF U-20 Championship, where he made three appearances.

Honours

Club
Pacific FC
Canadian Premier League: 2021

Career statistics

References

External links

Oregon State profile

1995 births
Living people
Association football goalkeepers
Canadian soccer players
Soccer people from British Columbia
People from Comox, British Columbia
Canadian expatriate soccer players
Expatriate soccer players in the United States
Canadian expatriate sportspeople in the United States
Vancouver Whitecaps FC players
Calgary Foothills FC players
Victoria Highlanders players
Phoenix Rising FC players
Pacific FC players
USL League Two players
USL Championship players
Canadian Premier League players
Canada men's youth international soccer players
2015 CONCACAF U-20 Championship players